Óscar Ignacio Hernández Polanco (born 7 March 1994) is a Chilean footballer who currently plays for Arturo Fernández Vial as a midfielder.

International career
He represented Chile U20 at the 2013 FIFA U-20 World Cup by replacing Ignacio Caroca in the final squad, making three appearances.

Honours
Unión Española
 Primera División (1): 2013–T
 Supercopa de Chile (1): 2013

References

External links

1993 births
Living people
People from Santiago
People from Santiago Province, Chile
People from Santiago Metropolitan Region
Footballers from Santiago
Chilean footballers
Chilean expatriate footballers
Chile under-20 international footballers
Chile youth international footballers
Association football forwards
Chilean Primera División players
Primera B de Chile players
Ascenso MX players
Segunda División Profesional de Chile players
Unión Española footballers
A.C. Barnechea footballers
Atlético San Luis footballers
C.D. Antofagasta footballers
Puerto Montt footballers
Deportes Linares footballers
C.D. Arturo Fernández Vial footballers
Chilean expatriate sportspeople in Mexico
Chilean expatriates in Mexico
Expatriate footballers in Mexico